Eoophyla ruwenzoriensis is a moth in the family Crambidae. It was described by David John Lawrence Agassiz in 2012. It is found in Uganda.

The wingspan is 23–26 mm. The forewings are pearly white with a dark brown subbasal fascia. The hindwings are white with a fuscous mark at the tornus.

Etymology
The species name refers to the Ruwenzori Mountains, where the species is found.

References

Eoophyla
Moths described in 2012